The 1968–69 Serie A season was won by Fiorentina.

Teams
Palermo, Hellas Verona and Pisa had been promoted from Serie B.

Events
The goal difference was introduced for the relegations instead of the tiebreakers.

Final classification

Results

Top goalscorers

Footnotes

References and sources
Almanacco Illustrato del Calcio - La Storia 1898-2004, Panini Edizioni, Modena, September 2005

External links
  - All results on RSSSF Website.

Serie A seasons
Italy
1968–69 in Italian football leagues